The following notable restaurants serve Indian cuisine:

 Annapurna Cafe, Seattle
 Adyar Ananda Bhavan, India
 Bollywood Theater, Portland, Oregon, U.S.
 Bombay Brasserie, Kensington, London, U.K.
 Bombay Cricket Club, Portland, Oregon
 Chai Pani
 Chutney Mary, London
 Desi PDX, Portland, Oregon
 East India Co. Grill and Bar, Portland, Oregon
 Gaggan, Bangkok, Thailand
 Indian Accent, New Delhi, India
 Maruti Indian Restaurant, Portland, Oregon
 Masque, Mumbai
 Meesha, Seattle
 Nirula's
 Tamarind, London
 Veeraswamy
 Vimala's Curryblossom Cafe, Chapel Hill, North Carolina, U.S.
 Vineet Bhatia London
 Zaika, Kensington, London

See also

 Bikanervala
 Dhaba
 Haldiram's
 Hindoostane Coffee House, London

External links
 

Restaurants
 
Lists of ethnic restaurants